The 2022 Garden Open was a professional tennis tournament played on clay courts. It was the fourteenth edition of the tournament which was part of the 2022 ATP Challenger Tour. It took place in Rome, Italy between 25 April and 1 May 2022.

Singles main-draw entrants

Seeds

 1 Rankings as of 18 April 2021.

Other entrants
The following players received wildcards into the singles main draw:
  Matteo Arnaldi
  Stefano Napolitano
  Giulio Zeppieri

The following players received entry into the singles main draw as alternates:
  Antoine Hoang
  Andrey Kuznetsov

The following players received entry from the qualifying draw:
  Kenny de Schepper
  Jonathan Eysseric
  Michael Geerts
  Ergi Kırkın
  Luca Van Assche
  Denis Yevseyev

The following player received entry as a lucky loser:
  Leandro Riedi

Champions

Singles

  Franco Agamenone def.  Gian Marco Moroni 6–1, 6–4.

Doubles

  Jesper de Jong /  Bart Stevens def.  Sadio Doumbia /  Fabien Reboul 3–6, 7–5, [10–8].

References

2022 ATP Challenger Tour
2022
April 2022 sports events in Italy
May 2022 sports events in Italy
2022 in Italian sport